Gerald Ray Strebendt (born March 1, 1979) is an American retired professional mixed martial artist. A professional competitor from 2001 until 2008, he fought for the UFC and Cage Rage. He is the former Cage Rage World lightweight champion.

Career
A former member of the United States Marine Corps, Strebendt is known for being the first student of the now world-renowned Brazilian Jiu-jitsu practitioner, Eddie Bravo where he adopted Eddie's rubber guard, and twister game. In 2004 he became the first fighter to execute a twister in an MMA match. 

Strebendt was a key witness in the 2005 murder trial of Rafiel Torre. Torre, whose real name is Ralph Bartel, initially offered Strebendt $10,000 to kill the victim, 32-year-old Bryan Richards, who had a sizable life insurance policy and with whose wife Torre was having an affair. After Strebendt refused, Torre committed the murder himself, then told Strebendt a few days later that he had killed Richards in self-defense with a rear naked choke. Torre asked Strebendt to provide him with an alibi, a request which was met with Strebendt's refusal. More than a year after the killing, Strebendt voluntarily came forward and provided his story to detectives, out of concern that Torre would escape punishment for the murder. Torre was convicted of the murder and sentenced to life in prison without the possibility of parole; he is appealing the sentence.

On January 29, 2014, Strebendt shot and killed 53-year-old David Paul Crofut, also of Springfield, during an altercation following a traffic collision between the two drivers' vehicles.  Strebendt called 911 following the collision but before shooting Crofut and was still connected with the 911 call when the shot was fired.  Strebendt claims self-defense in the shooting; Strebendt's attorney, Mike Arnold of Eugene, states that Strebendt reached into his vehicle and retrieved his weapon, a loaded .223 caliber semi-automatic rifle, because Crofut verbally threatened his life.  Carrying a loaded rifle in a vehicle is legal in Oregon.  Crofut was unarmed during the altercation, and no weapons other than Strebendt's rifle were found at the scene.  Following the shooting, Strebendt was handcuffed and taken into custody, but was released later that night. According to Strebendt on the 911 call, Crofut hit him "on purpose with his vehicle." Strebendt can be heard on the 911 call instructing Crofut to "back away" and "don't fucking come near me."  At the time of his death, Crofut had a blood alcohol content of 0.156%. The legal limit for driving under the influence of alcohol in Oregon is 0.08%. 

Strebendt was arrested and charged with murder on March 6, 2014, after a grand jury indictment. On May 21, 2015, the murder charge was dismissed and Strebendt pleaded guilty to criminally negligent homicide due to police establishing "some mitigating evidence" favoring Strebendt.  His attorney Mike Arnold and co-counsel Emilia Gardner went on to write a book about Strebendt and the case called Finishing Machine. He was released from state prison in 2017.

Eight months after his release from prison, Strebendt was arrested for allegedly sexually abusing an underage female on April 25, 2018. He was later sentenced by courts in Lane County, OR to two years and four months in prison with two years and eight months of probation.

Mixed martial arts record

|-
| Loss
| align=center| 9–7
| Lyle Beerbohm
| Submission (injury)
| EWC 3: Capitol Invasion
| 
| align=center| 1
| align=center| 2:42
| align=center| Salem, Oregon, United States
| 
|-
| Win
| align=center| 9–6
| Will Shutt
| Submission (rear-naked choke)
| SF 20: Homecoming
| 
| align=center| 1
| align=center| N/A
| align=center| Portland, Oregon, United States
| 
|-
| Loss
| align=center| 8–6
| Vítor Ribeiro
| Submission (guillotine choke)
| Cage Rage 12
| 
| align=center| 1
| align=center| 1:13
| align=center| London, England
| 
|-
| Loss
| align=center| 8–5
| Sean Sherk
| TKO (punches)
| Extreme Challenge 58
| 
| align=center| 1
| align=center| 3:52
| align=center| Medina, Minnesota, United States
| 
|-
| Loss
| align=center| 8–4
| Jean Silva
| Submission (triangle choke)
| Cage Rage 6
| 
| align=center| 2
| align=center| N/A
| align=center| London, England
|For the vacant Cage Rage World Lightweight Championship.
|-
| Win
| align=center| 8–3
| Dave Elliot
| Submission (twister)
| Cage Warriors 7: Showdown
| 
| align=center| 1
| align=center| 0:48
| align=center| Barnsley, England
| 
|-
| Win
| align=center| 7–3
| Pat Carr
| Submission (rear-naked choke)
| XFC 2: The Perfect Storm
| 
| align=center| 4
| align=center| 4:53
| align=center| Cornwall, England
| 
|-
| Loss
| align=center| 6–3
| Josh Thomson
| KO (punches)
| UFC 44
| 
| align=center| 1
| align=center| 2:45
| align=center| Las Vegas, Nevada, United States
| 
|-
| Win
| align=center| 6–2
| Jean Silva
| Submission (rear-naked choke)
| Cage Rage 2
| 
| align=center| 1
| align=center| N/A
| align=center| London, England
|Won the vacant Cage Rage World Lightweight Championship.
|-
| Win
| align=center| 5–2
| Carmelo Serrato
| Submission (rear-naked choke)
| Ultimate Cage Fighting 1
| 
| align=center| 1
| align=center| N/A
| align=center| Los Angeles, California, United States
| 
|-
| Loss
| align=center| 4–2
| Charles Bennett
| TKO (submission to punches)
| GC 7: Casualties of War
| 
| align=center| 1
| align=center| 1:40
| align=center| Colusa, California, United States
| 
|-
| Win
| align=center| 4–1
| Noah Shinable
| TKO (cut)
| GC 6: Caged Beasts
| 
| align=center| 1
| align=center| 4:23
| align=center| Colusa, California, United States
| 
|-
| Win
| align=center| 3–1
| Aaron Anderson
| Submission (triangle choke)
| GC 5: Rumble in the Rockies
| 
| align=center| N/A
| align=center| N/A
| align=center| Denver, Colorado, United States
| 
|-
| Win
| align=center| 2–1
| Mike Meto
| Submission (armbar)
| Kage Kombat
| 
| align=center| 1
| align=center| 1:52
| align=center| San Pedro, Los Angeles, California, United States
| 
|-
| Loss
| align=center| 1–1
| Eiji Mitsuoka
| TKO (submission to punches)
| KOTC 9: Showtime
| 
| align=center| 1
| align=center| 2:23
| align=center| San Jacinto, California, United States
| 
|-
| Win
| align=center| 1–0
| Aaron Herring
| Submission (armbar)
| Bushido 2
| 
| align=center| 1
| align=center| 2:54
| align=center| Yokohama, Japan
|

References

External links
 
 

American male mixed martial artists
Mixed martial artists utilizing Brazilian jiu-jitsu
Living people
People from Coos Bay, Oregon
American practitioners of Brazilian jiu-jitsu
1979 births
United States Marines
Ultimate Fighting Championship male fighters